Live is a live album by American hip hop artist and Wu-Tang Clan member Masta Killa, released on March 30, 2010, by Gold Dust Records. The album simply titled Live features performances with additional artists like Streetlife, GZA, Prodigal Sunn and Inspectah Deck.

Track listing 
 "Da Mystery of Chessboxin" (Accapella)
 "Armored Truck"
 "Silverbacks" (feat. Inspectah Deck & GZA)
 "Duel of the Iron Mic" (feat. GZA)
 "School"
 "Grab the Mic"
 "No Said Date"
 "In the Hood"
 "Love Spell" (feat. Startel)
 "D.T.D."
 "Street Education" (feat. Streetlife)
 "Whatever" (feat. Streetlife & Prodigal Sunn)
 "Fam Members Only" (feat. GZA)
 "Digiwarfare"
 "Guillotine" (Swordz) (feat. GZA)
 "Triumph" (feat. Inspectah Deck, GZA)

References 

Masta Killa albums
2010 live albums